Gluta papuana is a species of plant in the family Anacardiaceae. It is a tree endemic to New Guinea. It is threatened by habitat loss.

References

p
Endemic flora of New Guinea
Trees of New Guinea
Vulnerable plants
Taxonomy articles created by Polbot